Groundfloor is an American real estate investing and lending marketplace. It was the first real estate crowdfunding company to achieve SEC qualification utilizing Regulation A+ since the regulation became operable through the JOBS Act.

Groundfloor was purposely built to serve self-directed investors instead of institutional ones. By October 2018, Groundfloor had loaned more than $70 million across over 500 properties in the United States and had fundraised $13.8 million.

History

Groundfloor was founded in Raleigh, North Carolina, in February 2013 by Brian Dally (who launched Republic Wireless) and Nick Bhargava (contributor to the JOBS Act). In March 2014, the company raised $300,000 from angel investors in the region. After raising $1 million in seed funding, Groundfloor moved its headquarters to Atlanta because of the Invest Georgia Exemption (IGE) which allows state residents to invest in crowdfunded projects regardless of their investor accreditation status.

In August 2015, Groundfloor became the first real estate crowdfunding company to achieve SEC qualification under Regulation A+, since the regulation became operable through the JOBS Act.
The company subsequently opened investing in California, Illinois, Maryland, Massachusetts, Texas, Virginia, Washington, Georgia and the District of Columbia in the fall of 2015. By late October, Groundfloor sold out every loan originally listed. By December, the company had funded 54 loans and sold more than $3 million in Limited Recourse Obligation securities. It also closed a $5 million Series A round, bringing its total financing to $7.5 million. The round was led by Fintech Ventures, a $100 million venture capital investment fund focused on innovation in non-bank lending, savings and smart payments, managed by Serguei Kouzmine. Groundfloor announced it would use the money to expand its business beyond the present nine states where it operates.

In 2017, Groundfloor originated $30 million in loans. By October 2018, the company had loaned more than $70 million across 500 properties in the United States, one third of which are in Atlanta. Following $4.2 million secured from 2304 investors during the 2017-18 campaign, as of October 2018 the company had fundraised $13.8 million.

Platform
Groundfloor was purposely built to serve self-directed investors instead of institutional investors. Its marketplace provides short-term, high-yield returns backed by real estate. Typical loans return 12 percent annually on a six-to-12-month term. In November 2015, Groundfloor 2.0 was introduced, reducing the minimum investment to $10.

Groundfloor targets residential-development projects. They use a proprietary loan grading algorithm in addition to application review to assign a loan a letter grade and corresponding rate. Loan terms generally range from six to 12 months and financing can be in a senior or junior position.

In October 2015, Groundfloor introduced two new tools that expand peer-to-peer lending of real estate: quick comparison of loans and in-depth analysis of loan grading factors.

See also
 Disruptive innovation

References

External links
 
Marketplace.org

Investment companies of the United States
Companies based in Raleigh, North Carolina
Financial services companies established in 2013
Peer-to-peer lending companies
Crowdfunding platforms of the United States